Ussama Soleman (born Regensburg, 21 March 1983), better known as "U-cee", is a German funk-, dancehall, and soul music singer. Since 2009, he has been the lead singer of U-cee & The Royal Family.

Biography 
U-cee was born as son of a Tunisian mother and an Egyptian father, His funk & soul crew UST Virgin Records got the first record contract at Virgin Records for a single production in 1998. In 2000, he published together with his hip hop band Rundfunk 2 from Nürnberg the album "Ruhestörung" (disturbing the peace). Afterwards he joined the drum and bass group Bassline Paranoia in Regensburg, and founded the event agency IPF Entertainment. Since 2001, he has toured with the hip hop & soul band Flowkiste from Regensburg, and they published the album Image in 2003. In 2002, he also supported at taping the "Team Eimsbush" sampler. Since 2003, he has also toured as MC and singjay of the  reggae & dancehall band Mortal Kombat Sound (MKS). In 2004, he became a member of King Banana, which was reformed in the middle of 2009. U-cee became lead singer of the new formation, henceforward with the name U-cee & The Royal Family. U-cee also has toured with his band colleague DJ Rufflow as duo, and sometimes also with him and Bettina, Tine Parge also known as "Miss Soulstice" as trio since 2005.; until 2009, with the name King Banana-Soundsystem, and since the renaming of the mother band with the name Royal Family Soundsystem. U-cee contributed to Moodorama's track "Mind Traffic" (album title: My Name Is Madness on Mole Listening Pearls record label), and to other tracks of further bands.

References

External links 
 U-cee & The Royal Family

German soul singers
Funk singers
Dancehall musicians
Musicians from Regensburg
1983 births
German people of Tunisian descent
German people of Egyptian descent
Living people
21st-century German male singers